In Greek mythology, Calaurus (Ancient Greek: Καλαύρου) was the eponym of the island of Kalaureia near Troezen. He was the son of Poseidon.

Note

References 

 Stephanus of Byzantium, Stephani Byzantii Ethnicorum quae supersunt, edited by August Meineike (1790-1870), published 1849. A few entries from this important ancient handbook of place names have been translated by Brady Kiesling. Online version at the Topos Text Project.

Children of Poseidon
Demigods in classical mythology